Salt Lake City Weekly (usually shortened to City Weekly) is a free alternative weekly tabloid-paged newspaper published in Salt Lake City, Utah. It began as Private Eye. City Weekly is published and dated for every Thursday by Copperfield Publishing Inc. of which John Saltas is majority owner and president.

History
John Saltas founded what would become Salt Lake City Weekly in June 1984. He called his monthly publication Private Eye because it contained news and promotions for bars and dance clubs, which due to Utah State liquor laws were all private clubs. Saltas originally mailed the Private Eye as a newsletter to private club members. State law forbade private clubs from advertising at the time, so Saltas' newsletter was the only way for clubs to provide promotional information.

In 1988 Private Eye became a bi-weekly newspaper although it was available mostly in clubs. Distribution of the paper broadened as new liquor rule interpretations at the Utah Department of Alcoholic Beverage Control (DABC) allowed mainstream media to carry club advertisements as long as they weren't "soliciting" members. Private Eye thus ended its mailed period and was available for free in public distribution outlets for the first time. In 1989, Private Eye was admitted to the Association of Alternative Newsweeklies (AAN), the organization's 40th member.

Private Eye Weekly
In 1992 Private Eye Weekly emerged as a weekly tabloid-style alternative paper with distribution outlets in Salt Lake City, Ogden, Park City and Utah County. Saltas hired his first editor, then-KSL-TV journalist Tom Walsh, a veteran writer with experience from the alternative Phoenix New Times, who took a significant salary cut because of his enthusiasm for the new paper.

Early contributors to Private Eye included Ben Fulton (who served as editor-in-chief until spring 2007), Christopher Smart (currently a reporter for The Salt Lake Tribune), Mary Dickson, Katharine Biele, Lynn Packer, and notable Utah defense attorney Ron Yengich.

From 1992 onward, reporter Lynn Packer scooped many stories about then-Salt Lake City Mayor Deedee Corradini, and Bonneville Pacific, an energy company. Ron Yengich's relationship with the paper would end days after he was retained as Corradini's attorney in 1996. Yengich had mocked the mayor in a Private Eye column just days before becoming her representative.

Tom Walsh left the paper in June 1996 to become executive of another alternative weekly, the Miami New Times. Private Eye hosted the annual AAN convention on May 29–31, 1996, after Walsh had announced his resignation.

During 1996, the newspaper's page count outgrew the capacity of independent Salt Lake City presses, so the paper made printing arrangements with the publisher of the Ogden Standard-Examiner. Content for City Weekly is sent via computer to the press in Ogden, Utah, and bundles of printed papers are trucked south to Salt Lake City for distribution. The paper also began posting all content online in 1996, originally using the URL www.avenews.com. City Weekly is currently available at www.cityweekly.net, and starting in 2005 began posting additional information on a sister-commerce site, cwlistings.com.

In the early 1990s the paper began giving out yearly awards based on reader votes and staff input. The categories and pages devoted to the "Best of Utah" issues expanded over time, and these issues are typically the year's largest. Many establishments proudly display City Weekly "Best of..." awards, and often have several years' worth mounted above the cash register.

In 1996 the paper began recognizing local music in the "SLAMMY awards" (Salt Lake Area Music & More). As with the "Best of Utah" issues, locals are encouraged to vote for their favorite local bands and albums in different categories. The paper also hosts a party featuring several of the winners.

Salt Lake City Weekly
In 1997 the growing paper changed its name to Salt Lake City Weekly, abbreviated to City Weekly on the masthead. Many people misunderstood the paper's original name, assuming that the Private Eye was a detective agency.

The paper published stories of the 2002 Winter Olympics bribery scandal. Discoveries that International Olympic Committee members apparently accepted gifts in return for votes to select Salt Lake City as the Olympic host erupted into an internationally significant story in 1999 and 2000.

During the late 1990s, a suit to allow club and liquor advertising began making its way through local courts. City Weekly had tried and failed to persuade the state's Department of Alcoholic Beverage Control to lift Utah's peculiar restrictions on liquor advertising. National media like Wall Street Journal and USA Today were published without constraints on their advertising. The case dragged on for years in Utah District Court before Judge David Sam, who rejected the claim that advertising liquor in Utah was bound by national precedent. The Tenth Circuit Court of Appeals overturned this ruling on July 24, 2001, when the court remanded plaintiff's request for appeal on the district court's ruling to deny preliminary injunction. The Tenth Circuit stated that the plaintiffs satisfied requirements for an injunction, forcing the state to allow liquor advertising. In August the Utah Alcoholic Beverage Control Commission began drafting amendments to legalize liquor advertising in print, in restaurants, and on billboards. The LDS Church thought that the commission's proposed changes went too far and urged retention of the old rules. Saltas chided the Church in an editorial, but offered them a free full-page ad so they could explain their position against liquor advertising. The Church had not previously advertised in the paper, which was often considered anti-Mormon, but they accepted Saltas' offer. On November 29, 2001, City Weekly published the LDS statement. The same issue carried the paper's first liquor ad, for Jim Beam. Saltas told the Tribune that the timing was "just an ironic coincidence."

In October 2002, editor Christopher Smart left City Weekly for a reporting position with The Salt Lake Tribune. Saltas named John Yewell as editor; his tenure lasted nine months. Associate editor Ben Fulton was named editor pro-tem, and later was given the post. Fulton ran the paper until April 2007, garnering several awards, including a Hearst Award for long-form journalism, as well as several first-place awards from the Utah Chapter Society of Professional Journalists and the Utah Press Association.

As the paper gained popularity and staff, the load on John Saltas decreased. In 2003 he stepped aside as publisher, naming Jim Rizzi, who had been hired in 2002 as a vice-president, as his successor. After being uninvolved with the paper's operations for several months, Saltas was asked to contribute a weekly column. Saltas now writes a light-hearted, somewhat blog-like column called "Private Eye", discussing his favorite Utah Jazz players, his Greek heritage, and jokes that he would soon be fired.

In April 2007 Holly Mullen was announced as the paper's new editor. She had been an area journalist for nine years, most recently (until January 2007) as a columnist for The Salt Lake Tribune. In addition to her renown as a liberal reporter and writer, she is now noted as the wife of former Salt Lake City Mayor Ted Wilson. On February 26, 2009, Mullen informed her friends through her Facebook profile that she had parted ways with the paper. At the same time, longtime City Weekly Managing Editor Jerre Wroble was promoted to the Editor position; she left the paper in 2013, replaced in 2014 by Rachel Piper. She returned to guide the paper for a year (January 2015-5 May 2016) when Piper departed.

Salt Lake City Weekly is currently available at over 2,000 locations, including sites outside the Salt Lake Valley (such as the Tooele Valley). The paper is found online at www.cityweekly.net. The 55,000 weekly Circulation for City Weekly is independently audited by Verified Audit and has been so for nearly 20 years.

In 2009, the Utah SPJ awarded Salt Lake City Weekly 13 journalism awards:
Stephen Dark, a senior staff-writer won Best Newspaper Reporter. The judges wrote, "by far Dark had the most diverse and interesting subject matter. His ability to tell a story in a clean and compelling manner also stood out." Dark won in the Military Reporting category for "Diary of a Suicide" and in Religion/Values Reporting for "Swap Meet."
Scott Renshaw, the Arts and Entertainment Editor received 2nd place in Review/Criticism for the article, "Romancing the Stoned" and 2nd place for Headline Writing.
Eric S. Peterson received 2nd in Criminal Justice Reporting for the article, "Hard Labor" and 1st place in Consumer Reporting for the article, "Jacked". The judges wrote, "Peterson did an excellent job of raising questions about the necessity for steep state tax breaks for oil companies at a time when they were earning record profits. He attempted to independently calculate the cost to taxpayers, who he pointed out are paying more at the pump in Utah than residents of other states without such a big industry presence. He was also fair, offering significant commentary from oil executives who say they need breaks to counter the costly process of production. With both sides, Peterson facilitated an intellectual debate with no easy answers."
Eric Peterson won 1st place in the Government Reporting category for the article, "Drug Deal." The judges wrote "Peterson offers a comprehensive analysis of a no-bid contract and the influences that contributed to the deal-making process. Reporter went above and beyond his call of duty by investigating business incorporation records, raising questions about the validity of the company awarded work and the state's attending to detail. Looks ripe for a follow-up."
Eric Peterson received 3rd place in Minority Issues Reporting for "Afraid to Talk." 
Ted McDonough won 3rd place for Consumer Reporting for the article "Renting Sucks!"
Ted McDonough won 3rd Place in Medical/Science Reporting for "Dust Up".
Ted McDonough won 3rd place in the Personality Profile category for "Final Shot."
Carolyn Campbell won 3rd place for "Gay Bride" in Religion/Values reporting.

John Saltas became the publisher again in May 2012.<ref name="Beebe">Paul Beebe, Salt Lake Tribune, April 26, 2012, "Publisher Rizzi exits Utah's City Weekly". Retrieved September 9, 2012.</ref> His General Manager was Andy Sutcliffe until 2015.

Editors
1984 - 1992: John Saltas
1992 - 1996: Tom Walsh
1996 - October 2002: Christopher Smart
November 2002 - August 2003: John Yewell
August 2003 - April 2007: Ben Fulton
April 2007 - February 2009:  Holly Mullen
February 2009–May 2013: Jerre Wroble
May 2013-May 2014 (Interim): Rachel Piper, Scott Renshaw, Stephen Dark
June 2014-January 2015: Rachel Piper
January. 2015 - May 5, 2016: Jerre Wroble
May 2016 - April 2020: Enrique Limón

Publishers
1984 - Nov 2003: John Saltas
Nov 2003–May 2012: Jim Rizzi
May 2012 – Present: John Saltas

City Weekly and politics
In its origin as a publication promoting Salt Lake City-area nightlife during a time when state alcohol regulations were more strict, City Weekly developed a reputation for its tendency to challenge established viewpoints—a reputation which now extends to the paper's coverage of local politics.

Apart from covering scandals about former Democratic Salt Lake City Mayor Deedee Corradini, the paper controversially editorialized against her and her associates. The paper often listed her actions as "misses" in the "Hits & Misses" column on the opinion page.City Weekly attacks on district attorney Neal Gunnarson so upset him that he stole hundreds of copies of the paper from the racks in 1997. Technically, this is theft because only the first copy of each publication is free; additional copies are one dollar each. An article appearing in the issue posited that Gunnarson was being too soft on Mayor Corradini, claiming that his weak prosecution didn't "pass the smell test."

During the 1999 mayoral elections, the scandal-ridden Corradini declined to seek re-election. City Weekly endorsed Rocky Anderson in a crowded primary. Anderson had been retained by the paper as an attorney on occasion. Facing Stuart Reid, a member of Corradini's administration, Anderson won, but the paper remained neutral during his 2003 re-election. However, during Anderson's second term, he was visiting another city and crossed a police picket line in order to attend a scheduled meeting. He later remarked to a reporter that the line was not a picket line, but a demonstration, so there was no harm in crossing. This did not sit well with John Saltas, who viewed it as a repudiation of a useful labor negotiating tactic, and since that time Saltas has made several critical comments toward the Mayor in his columns.

In 2004, City Weekly published a series of articles criticizing embattled Salt Lake County mayor Nancy Workman. Workman was acquitted of criminal charges for misuse of County funds, but was forced out as a candidate by vote of the Salt Lake County Republican Party Central Committee. The Central Committee then proceeded to nominate and accept by acclamation candidate and developer Ellis Ivory. In the ensuing election Ivory was defeated by Democrat Peter Corroon.

Relationships to other Salt Lake papersCity Weekly comments extensively on local media through a "media beat" column and letters from the editor. In 2006 the major newspapers (through their joint publishing arm, MediaOne, formerly the Newspaper Agency Corporation) launched In Utah This Week, a free weekly events-oriented newspaper. Throughout the alternative newspaper industry, such publications produced by a city daily are referred to as Fake Alts, or FauxAlts. In Utah This Week ceased publication a few years later.

Saltas has mocked the Tribune's byline "Utah's Independent Voice" by calling the paper "Utah's co-dependent voice." The paper, he points out, is published with the same MediaOne facilities as the two paper's joint operating agreement. Thus City Weekly casts the paper as being "less independent than it pretends to be."

The 2002 Tribune acquisition by Dean Singleton, owner of the nation's 7th largest newspaper chain, prompted an exposé. City Weekly asserted that increased cooperation and expansion of the two daily papers under Singleton's Tribune leadership hurt surrounding papers' viability. The Tribune has hired two former reporters of the City Weekly, while City Weekly has hired several former Tribune reporters over the same time span, with moves in both directions affirming the legitimacy of news reporting in City Weekly. After emerging from bankruptcy in 2010, MediaNews Group lost control of the Tribune to a hedge fund, Alden Global Capital. As of May 2016, sale of The Tribune to a local businessman is being negotiated.

Current featuresCity Weekly tends to be geared toward a younger, more urban, and more liberal audience than the area's other papers. Its features include its reviews of art films (Scott Renshaw), restaurants (Ted Scheffler), local music groups, scheduled art shows and events, and television (Bill Frost). Founder Saltas writes a stream-of-thought column called "Private Eye." Katharine Biele writes an opinion-briefs feature called "Hits & Misses". Until 2014 the paper had a satire column called "Deep End" written by D.P. Sorensen who, among other things, jokingly claimed to have been Mitt Romney's missionary companion. It also carries syndicated columns "News Quirks" by Roland Sweet, and the Straight Dope, by Chicago-based Cecil Adams, Free Will Astrology and comics such as Tom Tomorrow's This Modern World, and Keith Knight's K Chronicles. The paper has also expanded its online content in recent years, including featured blogs from Gavin Sheehan.City Weekly publishes a number of special issues each year, including the Best of Utah guide and the City Weekly Music Awards (formerly SLAMMys'') issue (see also Music of Utah).

References

External links

 
 AAN Profile: Salt Lake City Weekly

Alternative weekly newspapers published in the United States
Newspapers published in Utah
Mass media in Salt Lake City